Angat is a village in Afghanistan, at the foot of the Ishkashem Pass. At the turn of the 20th century, there were six houses there.

References

Populated places in Ishkashim District